Cidex is a common designation for a variety of solutions used for antimicrobial or disinfection purposes, especially within the field of medicine:
Cidex OPA, a trade name for a solution with phthalaldehyde as active ingredient
Nu-Cidex, with peracetic acid
Cidex Plus, with glutaraldehyde

References

Antimicrobials